This Is Your Life may refer to:

Television 
 This Is Your Life (American franchise), an American radio and television documentary biography series hosted by Ralph Edwards
 This Is Your Life (Australian TV series), the Australian version of the American series
 This Is Your Life (British TV series), the British version of the American series
 This Is Your Life (New Zealand TV series), the New Zealand version of the American series

Literature 
 This Is Your Life, a 2002 novel by John O'Farrell

Music

Albums 
 This Is Your Life (Norman Connors album) or the title song, 1977
 This Is Your Life (Out of Eden album) or the title song, 2002
 Ronnie James Dio – This Is Your Life, 2014
 This Is Your Life, by the Adicts, or the title song, 1984
 This Is Your Life, by Augustines, 2016
 This Is Your Life, an EP by Glaxo Babies, or the title song, 1979

Songs 
 "This Is Your Life" (song), by Switchfoot, 2003
 "This Is Your Life", by the 5th Dimension from Portrait, 1970
 "This Is Your Life", by Banderas, 1991
 "This Is Your Life", by the Bee Gees from E.S.P., 1987
 "This Is Your Life", by the Blow Monkeys from Whoops! There Goes the Neighbourhood, 1989
 "This Is Your Life", by Carcass from The Heartwork, 1993
 "This Is Your Life", by Dio from Angry Machines, 1996
 "This Is Your Life", by the Dust Brothers, from the film Fight Club, 1999
 "This Is Your Life", by En Vogue from Funky Divas, 1992
 "This Is Your Life", by the Killers from Day & Age, 2008
 "This Is Your Life", by Propagandhi from Supporting Caste, 2009
 "This Is Your Life", by Robin Schulz from Sugar, 2015

See also 
 This Is My Life (disambiguation)
 This Is the Life (disambiguation)